The Guldborgsund bridge spans the northern end of the Guldborgsund, between the islands of Lolland and Falster in Denmark.  The bridge consists of two steel arched spans with a 30m central opening section having two rising bascules. It was built between 1933 and 1934, is 180m long and 7m wide, carrying two road carriageways and was officially opened by Prince Axel of Denmark on 6 October 1934.

External links
 
Danish highways bridge page (in danish)

Bridges in Denmark
Arch bridges in Denmark
Through arch bridges
Bascule bridges
Road bridges in Denmark
Bridges completed in 1934
1934 establishments in Denmark
Buildings and structures in Guldborgsund Municipality